{{infobox person
| image       = Edouard Pailleron par Carjat BNF Gallica.png
| caption     = Photograph of Pailleron by Étienne Carjat, | birth_name  = Édouard Jules Henri Pailleron
| birth_date  = 
| birth_place = Paris, France
| death_date  = 
| death_place =
| education   = 
| parents     = 
| spouse      = 
| children    = 3
| awards      = Légion d'honneur
}}
Édouard Jules Henri Pailleron (7 September 183419 April 1899) was a French poet and dramatist best known for his play .

 Early life 
Édouard was born in Paris on 7 September 1834. From a Parisian cultured "bourgeoise" family (upper-middle class), he earned first a doctorate in law, then became in succession a lawyer, notary clerk, soldier (a dragoon for two years), but irresistibly attracted by writing, he achieved his first success in 1860 with his one-act play , represented at the Odéon-Théâtre in Paris.

 Career 
thumb|right|Édouard Pailleron by John Singer Sargent
He had a successful career with his comedies about social customs.

Following his marriage, he became co-director of the Revue des Deux Mondes, a monument of the Romantic literature era founded by his father-in-law.

The play, a satirical comedy in three acts, ridiculed contemporary upper class society and was filled with transparent allusions to well-known people. The play was later adapted into English by Clinton Stuart under the title Our Society and presented at Madison Square Theatre in 1886. In America, the role of Suzanne, which was originated by French actress Suzette Reichenberg, was played by Annie Russell.

His triumphal success earned him his election to the famous Académie française in 1882 (seat n°12) and he was awarded the Légion d'honneur.

After his death, his plays continued to be produced and staged for many years.

 Personal life 

In 1862, he married Marie Buloz, the daughter of François Buloz, founder and director of the world-wide famous Revue des Deux Mondes. From his marriage with Marie, Edouard had three children:

 Édouard Pailleron Jr., who married Marguerite Forest, a daughter of his friend, the French Senator Charles Forest.
 Henri Pailleron, who died at only six years old.
 Marie-Louise Pailleron (1870–1951), who became an erudite historian of the "Revue des deux mondes" and of the major names in French literature of the 19th century. She married, and divorced, French writer Paul Bourget.

Pailleron died on 19 April 1899.

 Friendship with John Singer Sargent 
Pailleron was a close friend of the American artist John Singer Sargent, who studied painting at the Parisian École des Beaux-Arts, introducing him to the Parisian high-life society which was very important for the beginning of his successful career. Sargent painted several portraits of Edouard and his family, which are all currently in museums, mainly American ones. Sargent painted a portrait of Edouard in 1879 (now in the Musée Chateau de Versailles, France), also his wife Marie in 1880 (now in the Corcoran Gallery of Art in Washington, D.C.), and also of his children, Edouard Jr. and Marie-Louise in 1881 (now in the Des Moines Art Center). These paintings were among the first to make John Singer Sargent famous.

 Legacy 
A statue bust of Edouard Pailleron, sculpted in 1906 by Russian-born artist Leopold Bernard Bernstamm, is located in the Parc Monceau in Paris.

Finally, his vacation property above Chambéry (Savoie), named "La Souris", built in the last years of the 19th century, is still surviving and virtually unchanged as the original park with trees more than 100 years old, even if the whole is now an allotment. In contrast, in the same park, the cottage of his friend Charles Forest, Senator of Savoie, whose daughter Marguerite married his son Edouard, no longer exists.

 Collège Édouard-Pailleron 
In France, his name became famous again in the 1970s because it was given to a school in Paris near Buttes Chaumont Park in northeastern Paris. The school was destroyed by a fire on 6 February 1973, killing 21 children.

 References 

 External links 
 Je Passais'', Pailleron's 1887 poem.

1834 births
1899 deaths
French poets
Writers from Paris
Members of the Académie Française
French male poets
19th-century poets
19th-century French male writers